Bilbao Arena is an indoor arena in the neighbourhood of Miribilla in Bilbao, Spain. The central hall can hold up to 10,014 people for basketball games. The central hall is also used for concerts and other kinds of shows. The facilities also include swimming pools and gymnasiums for the use of the local residents.

History
Since it opened in September 2010, it is the home arena of the Bilbao Basket club of the Spanish League. The 2011 FIBA Europe Under-20 Championship was contested at the venue.

Attendances
This is a list of league and European competition games attendances of Bilbao Basket at Bilbao Arena.

See also
Bizkaia Arena
List of indoor arenas in Spain

References

External links

Bilbao Basket Official Website 
ACXT Architects Official Website 

Indoor arenas in Spain
Basketball venues in Spain
Sports venues in the Basque Country (autonomous community)
Buildings and structures in Bilbao
Sport in Bilbao
Sports venues completed in 2010
Estuary of Bilbao
2010 establishments in Spain